Prada is a genus of skippers in the family Hesperiidae.

Species
Recognised species in the genus Prada include:
 Prada rothschildi Evans, 1928

References

Natural History Museum Lepidoptera genus database

Hesperiidae genera